Helen Kelesi was the defending champion but did not compete that year.

Karine Quentrec won in the final 6–3, 5–7, 6–3 against Cathy Caverzasio.

Seeds
A champion seed is indicated in bold text while text in italics indicates the round in which that seed was eliminated.

  Neige Dias (semifinals)
  Mercedes Paz (quarterfinals)
  Sandra Wasserman (first round)
  Laura Lapi (first round)
  Laura Garrone (second round)
  Laura Golarsa (quarterfinals)
  Sabrina Goleš (semifinals)
  Julie Halard (first round)

Draw

External links
 1989 Mantegazza Cup Draw

Ilva Trophy
1989 WTA Tour